Killybegs railway station served Killybegs in County Donegal, Ireland.

History

The station opened on 18 October 1893 on the Donegal Railway Company line from Donegal to Killybegs.

In February 1924 the goods shed was burgled and four cases of whiskey were taken.

It closed on 1 January 1960.

Routes

References

Disused railway stations in County Donegal
Railway stations opened in 1893
Railway stations closed in 1960